The 2001 Swedish Golf Tour, known as the Telia Tour for sponsorship reasons, was the 18th season of the Swedish Golf Tour, a series of professional golf tournaments held in Sweden.

A number of the tournaments also featured on the 1999 Challenge Tour (CHA) and the Nordic Golf League (NGL).

Schedule
The season consisted of 14 events played between May and September.

Order of Merit

References

Swedish Golf Tour
Swedish Golf Tour